Hartley Kelly Joynt (14 June 1938 – 12 May 2021) was an Australian cricketer. He played seventeen first-class matches for Western Australia between 1960/61 and 1964/65, scoring 48 on debut in Western Australia's victory over the touring West Indians. His highest score was 81 for a Western Australia Combined XI against the South Africans in 1963/64.

Joynt later became a journalist with The West Australian.

References

External links
 

1938 births
2021 deaths
Australian cricketers
Western Australia cricketers
Cricketers from Perth, Western Australia